Oddville may refer to:

Oddville, Kentucky, an unincorporated community in Kentucky
Oddville, MTV, an American television show